Clyde L. Vermilyea (born February 19, 1937) was a major general in the United States Marine Corps who served as commanding general of 4th Marine Aircraft Wing and Marine Corps Air Station Cherry Point.

References

1937 births
Living people
United States Marine Corps generals